Global X ETFs is a New York-based provider of exchange-traded funds that facilitates access to investment opportunities across the global markets. Founded in 2008, it has approximately $40 billion in managed assets, across more than 80 different products. The ETF issuer and manager is widely known for its Thematic Growth, Income and International product suites, in addition to its Core, Commodities and Alpha strategies. In July 2018, the company was acquired by Mirae Asset Global Investments.

History
Global X was established in 2008 and brought to market its first ETF in February 2009. The firm focused on previously unexplored ETF strategies in the subsequent years, launching a range of first-to-market single-country ETFs and commodity funds. In 2011, the firm introduced its first global dividend product, a strategy which it has subsequently adapted to U.S. equities, preferreds, REITs, emerging markets, alternatives, and most recently, EAFE equities.
 
Global X was also an early proponent of thematic investing, launching its first thematic ETF in 2010, targeting companies that offered exposure to the lithium cycle. The firm has since launched a range of additional strategies providing access to emerging themes in areas of technology, people and demographics, and U.S. infrastructure.

Global X was acquired by Mirae Asset Global Investments in July 2018 for $488 million.

Research and insights
In early 2016, the firm began expanding the scope of its published research, which spans the emergence of disruptive technologies, to the impact of geopolitics on developing economies, and the drivers impacting income-oriented investments.

References

External links 

 
 

American companies established in 2008
Financial services companies based in New York City
Financial services companies established in 2008
2008 establishments in New York City
Exchange-traded funds
2018 mergers and acquisitions